Volleyball has been a regular Southeast Asian Games sport since the 1977 edition, with an exception in 1999 event.

Indoor Volleyball

Men's tournaments

Medal summary
Below is the total medal count of SEA Games Men's Volleyball from 1977 to the present.

Women's tournaments

Medal summary
Below is the total medal count of SEA Games Women's Volleyball from 1977 to the present.

Combined medal summary
Below is the combined medal count of SEA Games Men's and Women's indoor volleyball from 1977 to the present.

Beach Volleyball
The beach volleyball event was inaugurated in the 2005 edition of the Southeast Asian Games, however, the sport was excluded from the games since the 2013 games. It made its return during the 2019 event.

Men's tournaments

Medal summary

Women's tournaments

Medal summary

Combined Medal Summary

References

 
Southeast Asian Games
Volleyball competitions in Asia